HLC can refer to:
 Hill City Municipal Airport, IATA code
 High Line Canal
 Higher Learning Commission
 Higher lending charge, a charge made by mortgage lenders
 Historic landscape characterisation
 HKFYG Lee Shau Kee College, a middle school in Tin Shui Wai, Hong Kong.
 Ho Lap College, a middle school in San Po Kong, Hong Kong.
 Homeland Learning Centre
  Homer Laughlin China, the manufacturer of the popu]]lar Fiestaware product line.
  Hybrid Layer Capacitor
 Hypothalamic-Limbic Complex